Nita Maynard (born 7 July 1992) is a New Zealand rugby league footballer who plays for the Parramatta Eels in the NRL Women's Premiership. 

Before switching to rugby league, she represented Australia in rugby union and rugby sevens.

Background
Born in Gisborne, New Zealand, Maynard moved to Australia in 2011.

Playing career

Rugby union
In 2014, she represented the Australian Wallaroos and in 2016, represented the Australia 7s team. She played for the Parramatta Two Blues before switching to rugby league in 2017.

Rugby league
In 2017, Maynard joined the Cronulla-Sutherland Sharks team in the NSWRL Women's Premiership. In October 2017, she was selected in the New Zealand 2017 Women's Rugby League World Cup squad. On 2 December 2017, she came off the bench in New Zealand's 16–23 final loss to Australia.

In May 2018, she represented NSW City at the Women's National Championships. On 22 June 2018, she represented New South Wales in their 16–10 win over Queensland. This would be Maynard's lone appearance for the Blues, as in April 2019, revised eligibility laws were introduced which ruled her ineligible to represent New South Wales.

On 16 June 2018, she signed with the Sydney Roosters NRL Women's Premiership team. In Round 1 of the 2018 NRL Women's season, she made her debut for the Roosters in their 4–10 loss to the New Zealand Warriors.

On 19 October 2019, Maynard scored the winning try for New Zealand in the final of the 2019 Rugby League World Cup 9s against Australia.

On 20 February 2021, she represented the Māori All Stars in their 24–0 win over the Indigenous All Stars.

In October 2022 she was selected for the New Zealand squad at the delayed 2021 Women's Rugby League World Cup in England.

References

External links
Sydney Roosters profile

1992 births
Living people
Australia international rugby sevens players
Australia international rugby union players
New Zealand Māori rugby league players
New Zealand female rugby league players
New Zealand women's national rugby league team players
Rugby league hookers
Sydney Roosters (NRLW) players
Australia women's international rugby union players
Rugby union players from Gisborne, New Zealand
Rugby union scrum-halves